

The Sablatnig SF-1 was a reconnaissance seaplane built in Germany during the First World War.

Development
It was a conventional two-bay biplane with staggered wings of unequal span and a fuselage of particularly sleek design. The pilot and observer sat in open cockpits in tandem, and the undercarriage consisted of twin pontoons braced to the underside of the fuselage and to wings.

Operational history
Sablatnig delivered the SF-1 prototype to the SVK (Seeflugzeug Versuchs Kommando – "Seaplane Testing Command") in October 1915 under the naval serial number 490. It was finally accepted into active naval service a full two years later, in October 1917. Although accepted for service with the Imperial German Navy, only the prototype was built, and no production order was forthcoming.

Operators

Imperial German Navy Air Service
SVK (Seeflugzeug Versuchs Kommando – "Seaplane Testing Command")

Specifications

Notes

References
 

 
 
 

1910s German military reconnaissance aircraft
Floatplanes
Sablatnig aircraft
Biplanes
Single-engined tractor aircraft
Aircraft first flown in 1915